The men's 800 metres events at the 2019 World Para Athletics Championships were held in Dubai on 7, 9, 12 and 15 November 2019.

Medalists

T34

T36

T53

T54

References 

800 metres
2019 in men's athletics
800 metres at the World Para Athletics Championships